Gamma Pi Epsilon was the women's honor society of Jesuit colleges and universities.

History
When Marquette University went co-ed in 1924, there was a desire for a women's honor society alongside the all-male Alpha Sigma Nu which had been created only 9 years prior.. Gamma Pi Epsilon was approved in 1924 and the first chapter chartered on April 6, 1925 at Marquette University.  Josephine Newell O’Gorman is considered the founder of Gamma Pi Epsilon. It was open to women of every academic discipline in the Association of Jesuit Colleges and Universities.

On March 30, 1973, the two societies, Alpha Sigma Nu and Gamma Pi Epsilon, merged under the name of Alpha Sigma Nu, becoming an honor society for both men and women.

Chapters
At the time of the merger in 1973, Gamma Pi Epsilon had chartered 14 chapters:

1925 Marquette University, Milwaukee, WI 
1947 Saint Louis University, St. Louis, MO
1950 Gonzaga University, Spokane, WA 
1951 Le Moyne College, Syracuse, NY 
1952 Creighton University, Omaha, NE 
1953 University of Detroit Mercy, Detroit, MI 
1958 University of San Francisco, San Francisco, CA 
1959 Wheeling Jesuit University, Wheeling, WV 
1962 Seattle University, Seattle, WA 
1963 Georgetown University, Washington, DC 
1964 John Carroll University, Cleveland, OH 
1966 Santa Clara University, Santa Clara, CA 
1971 Regis University, Denver, CO 
1971 Xavier University, Cincinnati, OH

See also
Association of Jesuit Colleges and Universities
List of Jesuit institutions
Jesuit Ivy

References

Defunct fraternities and sororities
Student organizations established in 1925
 
1925 establishments in Wisconsin
1973 disestablishments in Wisconsin